Medial genicular artery may refer to:

 Inferior medial genicular artery
 Superior medial genicular artery